The Pantera RX6 is a Rallycross Supercar produced by MJP Racing. Production of the RX6 began in 2018 for a new one-make class of rallycross racing known as the Titan class (making its debut in TitansRX International Europe Series), making the RX6 the second rallycross car designed specifically for a new class, after the RX2 car designed for the RX2 class by Olsbergs MSE.

The car was designed to combat the increasing costs of maintaining a supercar in Rallycross by supplying an affordable, easy to maintain car which is race ready. The car has also been designed to make it easier for female and disabled drivers to race with several adaptation options.

Engine and drivetrain
At present the Pantera RX6 uses a 2.3L EcoBoost engine from a sixth generation Ford Mustang, tuned to be suited to rallycross by racing specialists Pipo Moteurs, with bespoke drivetrain from Unic Transmissions. As the Pantera RX6 is designed to compete in a one-make racing class, there is only one type of engine at present with no variants.

Bodies 
As of early-2019, the following body kits are compatible with the Pantera RX6:

Race maintenance
At the car's launch conference in Vienna in 2018, the car's creator, Max Pucher, emphasised the car's key feature being its ease of maintenance, stating that each car could last 'two to three seasons depending on use', before requiring a 'full rebuild after approximately 3000km'. Since the car has been specifically designed for easy maintenance, certain limits were added to the car, such as the ECU being locked to prevent modification of the car's engine mapping. 

In a later interview, Pucher continued that these limitations and settings (including a 20% safety margin in torque limits) will allow a race team 'to service one car per race weekend with one chief and a junior mechanic with no need for race, engine or electronics engineers', as technical support is available at all Titans-RX races and provided as a service by the racing series. 

As part of the Titans-RX support service, spare parts will be available from all MJP Racing service trucks, excluding body kits, with wheels, tyres and fuel also being supplied at each race event, covered by an initial fee at the start of the Titans-RX Season.

See also
GRC Rallycross
Max Pucher
MJP Racing Team Austria
TCR Touring Car

References

Front-wheel-drive vehicles
Compact sport utility vehicles
Hatchbacks
Cars introduced in 2018
Touring cars
2010s cars
Rallycross
Global RallyCross Championship